Telescope Peak (Timbisha: Chiombe) is the highest point within Death Valley National Park, in the U.S. state of California. It is also the highest point of the Panamint Range, and lies in Inyo County. From atop this desert mountain one can see for over one hundred miles in many directions, including west to Mount Whitney, and east to Charleston Peak. The mountain was named for the great distance visible from the summit.

Geography

Telescope Peak is also notable for having one of the greatest vertical rises above local terrain of any mountain in the contiguous United States. This is comparable to the rises of other tall, but better known, U.S. peaks. However Everest rises much more, and much more steeply, above its southern base in Nepal.

A variety of trees can be found on the mountain, including single-leaf pinyon (Pinus monophylla), limber pine (Pinus flexilis), and, at the highest elevations, the ancient Great Basin bristlecone pine (Pinus longaeva).

Climbing
From Ridgecrest, California State Route 178 leads northeast into Death Valley National Park. The road turns to unpaved about  later as it loses its highway status.  It winds up through Wildrose Canyon up to a parking lot where the trail for the summit starts. The section from the Charcoal Kilns can be rough and might only be suitable for 4-wheel-drive cars with high clearance, depending on weather conditions.

Hiking Telescope Peak by the normal route involves a  round trip hike. The trail starts in the western part of Death Valley National Park at Mahogany Flat campground.  The trail slowly winds itself up to the summit  later at a steady gradient of roughly 8%. The standard route is maintained by the National Park Service, and no permit is required to climb the mountain. This route leaves directly from the Mahogany Flat Campground, and travels approximately two miles to Arcane Meadows. From Arcane Meadows, the trail winds five more miles gradually up toward Telescope Peak, mostly following the ridgeline to the summit. This route can also be used to access two nearby peaks, Bennett Peak and Rogers Peak, a traverse that adds on minimal extra mileage. The last two miles has many switchbacks that are very steep.

The route begins at the intersection of the West Side Road and the Hanaupah Canyon Road. For 6.5 miles, the route climbs out of the Badwater Basin and into Hanaupah Canyon. Approximately 1.5 miles after reaching the end of the road, the trail leads directly to Hanaupah Spring, a seasonal water source that may not be available year-round. At the spring, the route then turns directly north (right) onto a scree/talus slope. Although this slope may look difficult to ascend, this is the correct way. Climbers should find the best route possible up the slope. Once finished climbing the talus slope and reaching the ridgeline, climbers should then follow the ridgeline West to the Telescope Peak summit, which should be readily apparent.

The Shorty's Well to Telescope Peak route can be completed in one day by experienced hikers, and has one of the largest elevation gains that can be obtained up a single summit; it can be descended either via Mahogany Flat or as a round-trip back to Shorty's Well.

See also
 List of mountain peaks of California
 List of Ultras of the United States
 List of U.S. National Parks by elevation

References

External links

 
 
 

Mountains of Inyo County, California
Mountains of Death Valley National Park
Panamint Range
Death Valley
Mojave Desert
Protected areas of the Mojave Desert
Highest points of United States national parks
Mountains of Southern California
Mountains of the Mojave Desert